Biking for Babies is a 501c3 non-profit organization that hosts an annual long-distance bike ride to raise money and awareness for crisis pregnancy centers - a type of nonprofit organization established to persuade pregnant women against having an abortion. Young people, mostly college students and recent graduates, participate by riding hundreds of miles and raising money for their cause leading up to the ride. Biking for Babies has raised more than $100,000 for pregnancy centers throughout the country.

History
The idea for a long-distance bike ride as a fundraiser for this purpose was conceived by Mike Schaefer and Jimmy Becker in the summer of 2008.

The organization started as a project of Students for Life of Illinois in 2009 and spun off to become a non-profit organization in 2011.

The first ride was from Carbondale, IL to Chicago, IL. Each year it increased in distance and the next routes started in New Orleans and ended in Chicago. Now there are four routes that begin in separate locations (Green Bay, WI; Columbus, OH; Tylertown, MS; Holly, CO) and all converge in St Louis, MO. The bikers average more than 100 miles per day.

References

External links
 Biking for Babies – official site

Non-profit organizations based in Illinois
2009 establishments in Illinois